George Browne, DD (c. 1649–99) was a 17th century academic.

Brown  was born in Northumberland. He entered Trinity College Dublin in 1667 and graduated BA in 1671. He became a Fellow in 1673. He became professor of laws in 1886 and professor of divinity in 1693. Browne was Provost from 1695 to 1699.

References

1640s births
1699 deaths
People from Northumberland
Provosts of Trinity College Dublin
Regius Professors of Divinity (University of Dublin)
Year of birth uncertain